Ivovicia is an extinct genus of proarticulates. This monotypic genus has only one species: Ivovicia rugulosa.

References

Notes
 Budd, Graham E.; Jensen, Sören. The origin of the animals and a ‘Savannah’ hypothesis for early bilaterian evolution. Biological Reviews November 2015.
 Freeman, Gary. The rise of bilaterians. Historical Biology 2009 03.
 Sokolov, B.S.. The chronostratigraphic space of the lithosphere and the Vendian as a geohistorical subdivision of the Neoproterozoic. Russian Geology and Geophysics October 2011.
 Grazhdankin, Dmitriy. Patterns of Evolution of the Ediacaran Soft-Bodied Biota. Journal of Paleontology 2014 03.
 Retallack, Gregory J.. Ediacaran fossils in thin-section. Alcheringa: An Australasian Journal of Palaeontology 2016 10.

Proarticulata
Ediacaran life
Prehistoric bilaterian genera